B100 may refer to:

Radio stations
 KBEA-FM (99.7 FM, "B100"), a radio station in Muscatine, Iowa, U.S.
WBYT (100.7 FM. "B100"), a radio station in South Bend, Indiana, U.S.
 KFMB-FM (100.7 FM, "B-100")), a radio station in San Diego, California, U.S., now known as KFBG
 CKBZ-FM (100.3 FM, "B-100"), a radio station in Kamloops, British Columbia, Canada

Others
 B100 (New York City bus)
 Great Ocean Road (route number B100), Victoria, Australia
 An abbreviation for 100% biodiesel
 100 amp, type B – a standard circuit breaker current rating